Nicaragua competed at the 2008 Summer Olympics in Beijing. The country's flag-bearer at the Opening ceremony was boxer Alexis Arguello.

Athletics

Men

Women

Key
Note–Ranks given for track events are within the athlete's heat only
Q = Qualified for the next round
q = Qualified for the next round as a fastest loser or, in field events, by position without achieving the qualifying target
NR = National record
N/A = Round not applicable for the event
Bye = Athlete not required to compete in round

Shooting

Men

Swimming 

Men

Women

Weightlifting

See also
 Nicaragua at the 2007 Pan American Games
 Nicaragua at the 2010 Central American and Caribbean Games

References

sports-reference

Nations at the 2008 Summer Olympics
2008
Olympics